In  the late 19th century, Aiken, South Carolina, USA, gained fame as a wintering spot for wealthy people from the Northeast. The Aiken Winter Colony was established by Thomas Hitchcock, Sr. and William C. Whitney. Over the years, Aiken became a winter home for many famous and notable people including George H. Bostwick, James B. Eustis, Madeleine Astor, William Kissam Vanderbilt, Eugene Grace (president of Bethlehem Steel), Allan Pinkerton, W. Averell Harriman, Seymour H. Knox II and his sister Dorothy Knox Goodyear Rogers, heir to the Woolworth fortune, Devereux Milburn, C. Oliver and Hope Goddard Iselin.

The roots of the Winter Colony reach back to Celestine E. Eustis. She was the guardian of her niece Louise and brought her to Aiken for visits. Louise, who married the New York financier Thomas Hitchcock, Sr., joined with him to establish the roots of the Winter Colony. Hitchcock brought his wealthy friend William C. Whitney of the prominent Whitney family to Aiken to enjoy the climate and the loamy clay soil which was perfect for their stables of horses. As a result, the formations of the Winter Colony were established.

References

Aiken, South Carolina